The Shrewsbury Public School system is a suburban school district serving the town of Shrewsbury, Massachusetts. The school system is led by Superintendent Dr. Joseph M. Sawyer and Assistant Superintendent Amy B. Clouter.

Schools
The school system consists of 9 schools.
Shrewsbury High School (9-12)
Oak Middle School (7-8)
Sherwood Middle School (5-6)
Calvin Coolidge School (K-4)
Spring Street School (K-4)
Floral Street School (K-4)
Walter J. Paton School (K-4)
Maj. Howard W. Beal School (K-4)
Parker Road Preschool

References

External links
Shrewsbury Public Schools official website

School districts in Massachusetts
Shrewsbury, Massachusetts
Education in Worcester County, Massachusetts